Dioon stevensonii is a species of cycad native to Mexico.

References

Whitelock, Loran M. 2002. The Cycads. Portland: Timber Press.

External links
 

stevensonii
Flora of Mexico